Jill Godmilow (November 23, 1943) is an American independent filmmaker, primarily of non-fiction works, and an advocate for Post-Realism in documentary. She is an Emeritus Professor in the Department of Film, Television, and Theatre at the University of Notre Dame. Godmilow is a recipient of a Guggenheim Fellowship.

Early life
She was born outside Philadelphia and now resides in New York City. Godmilow studied Russian literature at the University of Wisconsin–Madison.

Career
Godmilow"s 1974 film with collaborator Judy Collins, Antonia: A Portrait of the Woman, about the pioneering female conductor Antonia Brico, received a nomination for Academy Award for Best Documentary Feature, and in 2003 was selected for the National Film Registry of the Library of Congress.

In 1984, she made Far From Poland, a non-fiction, post-realist feature about the Polish Solidarity movement, filmed entirely in the U.S.

Her 1987 feature film Waiting for the Moon is a biography of Gertrude Stein and Alice B. Toklas, played by actresses Linda Hunt and Linda Bassett. It was produced for PBS's American Playhouse series, released theatrically by Skouras Pictures, and won Best Feature Film at the Sundance Film Festival in 1987.

In 1998, What Farocki Taught premiered at the International Film Festival Rotterdam. The film is a replica, in color and in English, of Harun Farocki's 1969 black and white German language film Inextinguishable Fire, on the production of Napalm at Dow Chemical Company. Her film was featured in the 2000 Whitney Biennial.

See also
 List of female film and television directors
 List of LGBT-related films directed by women

References

External links

New York Times Biography
Profile on Video Data Bank
"What's Wrong With the Liberal Documentary?", Jill Godmilow, Peace Review, March, 1999
Un-Documenting History: An Interview with Filmmaker Jill Godmilow by Lynn C. Miller, Text Performance Quarterly, July 7, 1997, vol 7, number 3
"How Real Is the Reality in Documentary Films?" Jill Godmilow in conversation with Ann-Louise Shapiro", History and Theory ,Vol 36, No. 4, 1997, Wesleyan University Press

1943 births
Living people
American women documentary filmmakers
American documentary filmmakers
Film directors from Pennsylvania
Artists from Philadelphia
University of Wisconsin–Madison College of Letters and Science alumni
University of Notre Dame faculty
Sundance Film Festival award winners
American women academics
21st-century American women